2-Hydroxyisocaproic acid (HICA or leucic acid) is a metabolite of the branched-chain amino acid leucine. It is commonly sold as a purported muscle building supplement. It also has fungicidal properties. HICA was shown to increase protein synthesis and muscle mass in rats who were recovering from a period of induced atrophy.

HICA is also produced by several protozoans it has been reported to show anti- inflammatory activities.

References

Alpha hydroxy acids
Fungicides